Suada Samir Jashari (born 9 October 1988) is a Kosovan-born Albanian football former player and current manager who coaches Kosovo Women's Football League club KFF Mitrovica.  A midfielder during her playing career, she has been a member of the Albania women's national team.

Club career
Jashari at the age of 15, she started playing football in Kosova Prishtinë. On 18 October 2012, Jashari joined Albanian Women's National Championship side Juban Danja. Two days later, she made her debut in a 1–1 home draw against Tirana AS after being named in the starting line-up. Jashari then continues her career in Albanian Women's National Championship clubs like Tirana AS (2013–2014) and Vllaznia Shkodër (2014–2018). On 26 January 2018, Jashari returns to her homeland and joined with Kosovo Women's Football League club Mitrovica.

International career
On 4 April 2013, Jashari made her debut with Albania in 2015 FIFA Women's World Cup qualification preliminary round match against Malta after being named in the starting line-up. Her last international match was on 1 December 2020 against Portugal in Lisbon.

Managerial career

Mitrovica
On 12 January 2021, Jashari was appointed manager of Kosovo Women's Football League club Mitrovica. On 28 February 2021, she had her first match as Mitrovica manager in a 0–0 home draw against A&N.

Personal life
Jashari was born in Pristina, SFR Yugoslavia to Kosovo Albanian parents from Mitrovica. On 11 July 2012, he obtained Albanian passport.

See also
List of Albania women's international footballers

References

External links

Suada Jashari at the Albanian Football Association

1988 births
Living people
Albanian women's footballers
Women's association football midfielders
KFF Tirana AS players
KFF Vllaznia Shkodër players
Albania women's international footballers
Albanian football managers
Women's association football managers
Female association football managers
Sportspeople from Pristina
Kosovan women's footballers
KFF Mitrovica players
Kosovan football managers
Kosovan people of Albanian descent
Sportspeople of Albanian descent